USS Mullany may refer to the following ships of the United States Navy:

 , a  launched in 1920 and struck in 1930
 , a  launched in 1942 and stricken in 1971; transferred to the Republic of China as Chiang Yang; struck 1999

See also
 , a Gleaves-class destroyer originally laid down as Mullany in 1941

United States Navy ship names